Dormitator lophocephalus is a species of fish in the family Eleotridae found in Suriname, South America.

References

Murdy, E.O. and D.F. Hoese, 2003. Eleotridae. Sleepers. p. 1778-1780. In K.E. Carpenter (ed.) FAO species identification guide for fishery purposes. The living marine resources of the Western Central Atlantic. Vol. 3: Bony fishes part 2 (Opistognathidae to Molidae), sea turtles and marine mammals.

lophocephalus
Taxa named by Jacobus Johannes Hoedeman
Fish described in 1951